The Southwestern Front was an army group of the Imperial Russian Army during World War I. During the conflict it was responsible for managing operations along a front line that stretched 615 kilometers, from what is now southern Belarus to northern Romania, and took part in such operations as the Battle of Galicia and the Brusilov Offensive. It was established in August 1914 and lasted throughout the war until the unrest caused by the Russian Revolution, at which point it was demobilized along with the rest of the Russian Army in early 1918. In total some two million troops had been under its command.

Armies deployed on the Southwestern Front 
The following field armies were part of the Southwestern Front.
 3rd Army (July 1914 – June 1915 and June 1916 – July 1916)
 5th Army (July 1914 – September 1914) 
 8th Army (July 1914 – August 1917)
 4th Army (August 1914 – June 1915)
 9th Army (August 1914 – December 1916 )
 7th Army (October 1914 – early 1918)
 11th Army (October 1914 – early 1918)
 Special Army (September 1916 – November 1916 and July 1917 – early 1918)
 1st Army (July 1917 – September 1917)
 Separate Danube Army

Command

Commander of the armies of the Southwestern Front 
The commanders of the Southwestern Front were as follows.

Bolshevik leaders

Chiefs of Staff

References

Notes

See also
 List of Imperial Russian Army formations and units
 South-Western Front electoral district (Russian Constituent Assembly election, 1917)

Fronts of the Russian Empire
Military units and formations established in 1914
1914 establishments in the Russian Empire
Military units and formations disestablished in 1918
1918 disestablishments in Russia